The Buddhafinger is the debut album by New Zealand rock group, Tadpole, released on June 1, 2000. The album debuted in the Official New Zealand Top 40 Albums chart on August 20, 2000, and peaked at #2. The album spent a total of 44 weeks in the chart.

Track listing

References

Tadpole (band) albums
2000 albums